Prochoreutis miniholotoxa is a moth of the family Choreutidae. It is known from Kyrgyzstan.

The wingspan is about 9.5 mm.

References

Prochoreutis